Microsomatidia reticulata is a species of beetle in the family Cerambycidae, and the only species in the genus Microsomatidia. It was described by Sudre in 2001.

References

Parmenini
Beetles described in 2001